Sotiris Tsiloulis (born 14 February 1995) is a Greek professional footballer who plays as a right winger for Super League club Lamia.

Career
On 28 April 2018, Tsiloulis signed a four-year contract with top tier club Panionios.

Apollon Smyrnis
On 6 September 2020, he joined Apollon Smyrnis on a free transfer. He scored his first goal in a 3-1 home defeat against PAOK, on 8 November 2020.  On 30 November 2020, he opened the score in an eventual 3-3 home draw against Volos, despite a three-goal cushion early in the first half. 

On 16 January 2021, he scored helping to a 1-0 away win against AEL.

Career statistics

References

1995 births
Living people
Greek footballers
Gamma Ethniki players
Football League (Greece) players
Super League Greece players
PAS Lamia 1964 players
Anagennisi Karditsa F.C. players
Apollon Larissa F.C. players
Panionios F.C. players
Apollon Smyrnis F.C. players
Association football wingers
Footballers from Larissa